Judith Frank is an American writer and professor. She has been a two-time Lambda Literary Award nominee, winning in the Lesbian Debut Fiction category at the 17th Lambda Literary Awards in 2005 for her novel Crybaby Butch, and being a shortlisted nominee in the Gay Fiction category at the 27th Lambda Literary Awards in 2015 for All I Love and Know. She is Jewish.

Originally from Evanston, Illinois, Frank spent some time living in Jerusalem, Israel as a teenager. She was educated at the Hebrew University of Jerusalem for her B.A. and Cornell University for her MFA and PhD.  She joined Amherst College as a professor of English and creative writing in 1988.

She has also published short stories in The Massachusetts Review, Other Voices and Best Lesbian Love Stories 2005, as well as the critical study Common Ground: Eighteenth-Century English Satiric Fiction and the Poor.

Works
Common Ground: Eighteenth-Century English Satiric Fiction and the Poor (1997)
Crybaby Butch (2004)
All I Love and Know (2014)

Awards 
 2000:  Emerging Lesbian Writers Fund Award for fiction from the Astraea Foundation
 2005: Lambda Literary Award for Crybaby Butch
 2006: Yaddo artists' colony residency
 2008: National Endowment for the Arts fellowship
 2012: MacDowell Colony residency

References

External links
Judith Frank

American women short story writers
American short story writers
21st-century American novelists
American women novelists
American women non-fiction writers
Cornell University alumni
Writers from Evanston, Illinois
Novelists from Massachusetts
American lesbian writers
Amherst College faculty
American LGBT novelists
Jewish American writers
LGBT Jews
Living people
Year of birth missing (living people)
21st-century American women writers
Novelists from Illinois
Lambda Literary Award for Debut Fiction winners
21st-century American non-fiction writers
American women academics
21st-century American Jews